Hecamede albicans is a species of shore flies (insects in the family Ephydridae).

Distribustion
United States, Europe.

References

Ephydridae
Insects described in 1830
Diptera of North America
Diptera of Europe
Taxa named by Johann Wilhelm Meigen